"När jag tänker på i morgon" is a song written by Ingela "Pling" Forsman and Lasse Holm, and performed by Friends at Melodifestivalen 2000, where it ended up second together with the Barbados "song Se mig" .

The single, which was released the same year, peaked at 14th position at the Swedish singles chart. The song also charted at Svensktoppen for six weeks, peaking at third position, between 15 April-20 May 2000  before leaving chart.

Charts

References

2000 singles
Friends (Swedish band) songs
Melodifestivalen songs of 2000
Songs with lyrics by Ingela Forsman
Songs written by Lasse Holm
Swedish-language songs
2000 songs
Mariann Grammofon singles